Same-sex marriage in Nunavut has been legal since 20 July 2005. The Canadian territory began granting marriage licences to same-sex couples upon the passage of the federal Civil Marriage Act. In October 2003, Premier Paul Okalik announced that same-sex marriages performed in other jurisdictions would be legally recognized in Nunavut.

Background
On 30 October 2003, Premier Paul Okalik made the following statement:

"If developments in the Parliament of Canada and the Supreme Court of Canada result in the definition of marriage being broadened, we will respect the law and comply with that. In the meantime, anyone in Nunavut who has been legally married anywhere will be recognized by the Government of Nunavut as married."

Okalik further suggested that the territory would perform same-sex divorces should the issue arise. He also succeeded in passing a territorial human rights code banning discrimination on the basis of sexual orientation. As well, Nancy Karetak-Lindell, Liberal MP for the riding of Nunavut, was re-elected in the 2006 election after having supported same-sex marriage.

During the February 2004 general election, one of Premier Okalik's main opponents ran on the basis that he would repeal the territory's human rights legislation on sexual orientation, and would not recognize same-sex marriages. In 2005, a group of Inuit leaders called same-sex marriage "disruptive to traditional values" at a meeting of the Justice Committee of the House of Commons. Chris Trott, an associate professor at the University of Manitoba, says, "the elders are probably correct to say formal gay relationships are an example of southern influence. Practically speaking, liberation for Inuit homosexuals came in the form of the English language. In the encounter with the west, and in speaking English, they have a way of talking about that now. Once people find the vocabulary to articulate what they're feeling, then they say it. And I think that's what's going on now. Young people now have a way of speaking about it." Anglican and Pentecostal religious leaders have been adamantly opposed to the legalisation of same-sex marriage in Nunavut, often referring to it as "contrary to Inuit culture". A local in Iqaluit who was asked to comment for the Nunatsiaq News said "it's interesting to see religious leaders offering opinions on how Inuit should behave when Christianity itself is a southern import.".

Territorial legislation
In October 2011, the Legislative Assembly of Nunavut amended the Marriage Act (Inuinnaqtun: Katitiviliqinikkut Maligaq) and several other acts relating to family law and children law. The bill passed by the Assembly replaced the expression "husband and wife" with the gender-neutral term "spouses" in section 43(4) and added "or spouse" in section 13(b). The Adoption Act was also amended to allow same-sex couples to adopt children. The bill received royal assent by Commissioner Edna Elias on 31 October 2011.

Section 13 of the Marriage Act, entitled "Civil Marriage", reads:

Marriage statistics
From July 2005 to October 2006, only one same-sex couple married in Nunavut, the lowest among all of Canada's provinces and territories. The first same-sex marriage involving an Inuk man was performed between Joe Kucharski and Dwayne Nowdlak, who is originally from Pangnirtung, in June 2017. There had already been one marriage for an Inuk lesbian couple. The first same-sex marriage in Cambridge Bay was performed between Jason Koblogina and Kyle Mercer in August 2018.

The 2016 Canadian census showed that were 25 same-sex couples living in Nunavut, though it is unknown how many were married, in a common-law marriage or cohabiting.

Religious performance
In July 2019, the synod of the Anglican Church of Canada narrowly rejected a motion to authorise same-sex marriage and allow clergy in the church to officiate at such marriages. Instead, the church synod passed a resolution known as "A Word to the Church", allowing its dioceses to choose whether to perform same-sex marriages. Clergy of the Diocese of The Arctic, including Bishop David Parsons, have been vocally opposed to the solemnisation of same-sex marriages within the church. Following the passage of the resolution, several dioceses, including those of Ottawa and Rupert's Land, announced they would permit their clergy to solemnise same-sex marriages in accordance with the new resolution passed by the church synod. The Diocese of The Arctic chose to distance itself from these dioceses, but, responding to concerns that it might be leaving the Anglican Church of Canada, it released a statement, "The Diocese of the Arctic remains a diocese within the Anglican Church of Canada, but must distance itself from those who violate the marriage canon. The implication of this is a state of ‘impaired communion'."

See also
Same-sex marriage in Canada
LGBT rights in Canada
Sipiniq (ᓯᐱᓂᖅ), person in Inuit culture who is believed to have changed their physical sex as an infant

References

Nunavut
Politics of Nunavut
Nunavut law
2005 in LGBT history